Chris Stills (born April 19, 1974 in Boulder, Colorado) is a musician and actor. He is the son of American rock musician Stephen Stills and French singer-songwriter Véronique Sanson.  He has played with both his father and his mother.

Biography
When Chris was a child, his mother taught him how to play the piano, and though he also played drums, it wasn't until Chris was 12 that he picked up the guitar. On the road with Crosby, Stills, & Nash one day, one of the band's guitar techs put a spare guitar in the young Stills'  hands.  Upon learning some simple chords and a song, Chris was hooked. His parents divorced in 1978, and at 13 he went to live with his mother in Paris. He attended the American School of Paris while there, and at 16 Chris wrote his first song, "If I Were a Mountain."

After graduating from high school in 1993, Chris moved back to the United States, Los Angeles, and worked as a roadie for his father. He lived in New York for a few years, forming a band at one point with another American School alum, Adam Cohen, son of singer/songwriter Leonard Cohen. Stills later signed with Atlantic Records (the same label as his father's band), and released his solo debut album, 100 Year Thing, in January 1998.

Growing up listening to the classics like Buffalo Springfield, CSN, the Rolling Stones, Jimi Hendrix, Led Zeppelin, and the Police, as well as U2, Lenny Kravitz, Pearl Jam and The Black Crowes. Chris also drew influences from both parents (especially watching them perform live on the road) to create his own blend of 1960s-inspired rock, folk, and blues on 100 Year Thing. Other influences came from Chris' experience playing over the years with acts like the Jayhawks and Alt. Country singer Ryan Adams.

Chris's 2nd solo album, Chris Stills, was released overseas in October 2005 after he was signed by then president of V2 Records Alain Artaud. The record was released to Canada and the United States the following May 2006.

He also supported Richard Ashcroft on a European Tour.

Recorded at the Studio du Palais, the live EP When the Pain Dies Down: Live in Paris appeared later.

Beginning in August 2007, Chris toured with Mandy Moore in a small venue tour, opening for her in 15+ shows across the United States and Canada.

In 2009 Chris played the role of Julius Caesar in the musical Cleopatre - La Derniere Reine d'Egypt. It was the 2nd top grossing show in France for 2009 after #1 Johnny Hallyday.

The day after the play wrapped, Chris went on his first movie audition, where he landed the role of Alexander Child in the French film by first time director Jerome LeGris called Requiem for a Killer in 2010. The cast included Melanie Laurent, Clovis Cornillac and Tcheky Karyo.

During the making of movie and between shooting, Chris was working on a record entirely in French with producer Pierre Jaconelli for Alain Artaud. They had almost finished the making of the record, but things fell apart when Artaud, then president of Polydor/Universal, was abruptly fired. Chris then pulled the plug on the entire project, terminated his contract with Universal and returned to his home in Los Angeles.

In February 2012, Chris reconnected with Ryan Adams and opened up for him on a 3-week European tour.

In November 2012 Chris produced an EP with Grammy nominated producer Dan Burns. The 6 song EP entitled Chris Stills - Let it Rain is due out around April/May 2013 digitally online and in limited 10' Vinyl.

In 2014, Chris announced on his Twitter account that he would be part of the cast on the 4th season of  Shameless.

References

External links 

 
 

1974 births
Living people
Musicians from Boulder, Colorado
Stephen Stills